Kate Fagan (born November 15, 1981) is a sports reporter and commentator, who previously was employed by ESPN.  Before joining the ESPN staff, she worked as the Philadelphia Inquirer's beat writer for the NBA's Philadelphia 76ers.

Early life

Fagan was born in Warwick, Rhode Island. Fagan's father played professional basketball in Europe before later opening a financial investment company.  Her mother worked as a sales representative for McGraw-Hill. She attended Niskayuna High School in Niskayuna, New York, where she became the school's all-time leading scorer in basketball.

Fagan attended the University of Colorado at Boulder where she lettered in basketball. After suffering a foot injury as a freshman, she rebounded to be among the team's best shooters and scorers. She set a Big 12 Conference record by making 44 consecutive free throws during the 2002-03 season and was a perennial First-Team Academic Big 12 performer. In 2004, Fagan graduated from the University of Colorado at Boulder with a Bachelor of Science in Communication. She also played two seasons with the Colorado Chill of the National Women's Basketball League (NWBL).

Career
In 2006, Fagan began her professional career as a sports editor for the Ellensburg Daily Record; the following year she moved to the Glens Falls Post-Star as a sportswriter. Later, from 2008 to 2011, she was on the staff of the Philadelphia Inquirer, where she was the Philadelphia 76ers beat writer.

As an ESPN writer beginning in 2012, Fagan also made regular TV appearances on Around the Horn and First Take. As of January 18, 2018, Fagan had 36 wins on Around the Horn She co-hosted The Trifecta with Spain, Jane and Kate with Sarah Spain and Jane McManus on espnW and Will and Kate with Will Cain on ESPN Radio. Fagan's piece "Owning the Middle", a profile of basketball player Brittney Griner for ESPN The Magazine, was selected for inclusion in Glenn Stout's "Notable Sports Writing of 2013". In May 2017, Fagan started a podcast on ESPN called Free Cookies, which she co-hosted with her partner, yoga instructor Kathryn Budig. Fagan left ESPN at the end of 2018.

Fagan is a regular on the 538 podcast Hot Takedown.

In 2014, Fagan authored The Reappearing Act: Coming Out as Gay on a College Basketball Team Led by Born-Again Christians through Skyhorse Publishing. The memoir chronicles Fagan's experiences on the Colorado women's basketball team. Her second book, What Made Maddy Run, about Madison Holleran, a University of Pennsylvania track and field athlete who took her own life in 2014, was released on August 1, 2017. Her book delves into the pressure young women face in regards to social media, specifically Instagram. She brings to light the disparities between Holleran's depressive reality, and the fun and filtered photos that she posted on Instagram.

Personal life
On October 4, 2018, Fagan married her partner Kathryn Budig.

References

External links
Kate Fagan on Twitter
Kate Fagan (official)

1981 births
Living people
American sports radio personalities
American sportswomen
Basketball players from Rhode Island
Guards (basketball)
Colorado Buffaloes women's basketball players
LGBT basketball players
American LGBT sportspeople
People from Warwick, Rhode Island
University of Colorado alumni
LGBT people from Rhode Island
Lesbian sportswomen
American women's basketball players
American women sportswriters